Berardi is an Italian surname. Notable people with the surname include:

 Angelo Berardi (1636–1694), Italian music theorist and composer
 Antonio Berardi (born 1968), British fashion designer
 Carbo Sebastiano Berardi (1719–1768), Italian Roman Catholic priest and canon lawyer
 Cristofano Berardi, Italian engraver
 Domenico Berardi (born 1994), Italian footballer
 Fabio Berardi (born 1959), Sammarinese politician
 Fabio Berardi (engraver) (1728–1788), Italian engraver
 Filippo Berardi (born 1992), Sammarinese footballer
 Franco Berardi (born 1948), Italian Marxist theorist
 Gaetano Berardi (born 1988), Swiss footballer 
 Giancarlo Berardi (born 1949), Italian comic book writer
 Giovanni Berardi (1380–1449), Italian Cardinal
 Pasquale Berardi (born 1983), Italian footballer
 Simone Berardi (born 1979), Italian footballer

Etymology

See also
Bernardi

References

Surnames of Italian origin
Germanic-language surnames